William Barker (1 December 1838 – 28 January 1917) was Dean of Carlisle from 1908 to his death in 1917.

Born in London,  he was educated at Worcester College, Oxford  and ordained in 1862. He began his ecclesiastical career as Curate of Hanover Chapel, Regent Street after which he was the Chaplain to the Royal Ophthalmic Hospital, Moorfields. He was Vicar of St Mary's, West Cowes from 1873 to 1882 and an Honorary Chaplain to the Queen. From 1882 to 1888 he was a member of the London School Board, representing Marylebone.  He was Rector of St Marylebone until his elevation to the Deanery in 1908.

References

1838 births
Anglican clergy from London
Alumni of Worcester College, Oxford
Honorary Chaplains to the Queen
Deans of Carlisle
1917 deaths
Members of the London School Board